Saraipali is a town in Mahasamund district in the Indian state of Chhattisgarh. First chief minister of Madhya Pradesh, Ravishankar Shukla was elected from here.

Saraipali Tahsil is Mahasamund district's third most populous subdistrict, located in Mahasamund district of the state of Chhattisgarh in India. There are 23,500 villages in the sub district, among them, Deogaon is the most populous village with population of 287,865 and Kabaripali is the least populous village. Pali is the largest village in area the subdistrict with an area of 10,000 square kilometres and Sarangarh is the smallest village with an area of under 1 square kilometres.

There is only one city in the subdistrict jurisdiction.

Geography 
The
nearest towns are Basna ( west), Padampur ( south), Bargarh ( east) Sarsiwan ( north) and Sarangarh ( north). It is one of the fastest-growing towns in the Mahasamund district and  had a population of approximately 20,118. The town does not have an airport or a railway station, but there are many bus routes connecting with other towns and cities. Saraipali has many banks, finance and insurance companies, vehicle showrooms and other shops.

Politics 
The present President of Municipality is Mr. Amrit Patel (INC) and MLA of Saraipali is Kismat Lal Nand (INC).One Of The Parshad is Mr.Gunjan Agrawal Ward no. 06.
1st Mla- Pt. Ravishankar Shukla
1st president of municipal co.-Lt.Virendra Singh
1st Female president of municipal co.-Smt Shani Amar Bagga

Demographics 
 India, Saraipali had a population of 20118. Males constitute 52% of the population and females 48%. Saraipali has an average literacy rate of 69%, higher than the national average of 59.5%: male literacy is 77%, and female literacy is 63%. In Saraipali, 14% of the population is under 6 years of age.

References 

Cities and towns in Mahasamund district